Éric Laurrent (born 1966 in Clermont-Ferrand) is a contemporary French writer.

Work 
His work, begun in 1995 with Coup de foudre, is distinct from other works of the postmodern generation by a style that could be described as manierist or baroque. Like other postmodern authors, Eric Laurrent practices intertextuality abundantly, using each of his novels not as a rewriting of a classical work, but more as a burlesque tribute to the world's literary heritage. Thus, for example, the spy novel Les atomiques, his second novel (1996), plays on a re-reading of the Divine Comedy by Dante. Intertextuality can, in some cases, come more from intermediality, as in the case of his first novel, built around the presence in the hollow of the painting The Birth of Venus by Botticelli.

Publications 
1995: Coup de foudre, novel (Éditions de Minuit) – Prix Fénéon
1996: Les Atomiques, novel (Minuit) 
1997: Liquider, novel (Minuit)
1999: Remue-ménage, novel (Minuit) 
2000: Dehors, novel (Minuit)
2002: Ne pas toucher, novel (Minuit) 
2004: À la fin, novel (Minuit)
2005: Clara Stern, novel (Minuit)
2008: Renaissance italienne, novel (Minuit)
2011: Les Découvertes, novel (Minuit) – Prix Wepler.
2014: Berceau, narration (Minuit)
2016: Un beau début, novel (Minuit)  – Prix Alexandre-Vialatte.

References

External links 
 Un beau début on Télérama
 Éric Laurrent et la pin-up de “Dreamgirls” on Bibliobs
 Un beau début on Babelio
 Eric Laurrent - Un beau début on YouTube

20th-century French non-fiction writers
21st-century French non-fiction writers
Prix Fénéon winners
1966 births
Writers from Clermont-Ferrand
Living people